Howard Wood may refer to:

Politicians
Howard R. Wood, politician
Howard Kingsley Wood, politician

Others
Howard Wood (basketball)
Howard Wood (environmentalist)
Howard Wood (curler)
Howard Wood (coach), American football, basketball, and baseball coach
Howard Wood, Jr., see Granite Curling Club (Winnipeg)

See also

Howard's Woods